Eino Hanski (17 July 1928 – 17 August 2000) was a Swedish-Finnish-Russian-Karelian author, dramatist and sculptor. 

Born in Leningrad in the Soviet Union, Eino Hanski's father was Finnish and his mother Karelian; Russian became his main language growing up, but most of his books were written in Swedish. Hanski came to Sweden in 1942 with his mother as a refuge from the war. His father died in the war. 

Hanski lived in Gothenburg but returned to the Soviet Union many times; and it is also the subject of many of his writings.

External links 

1928 births
2000 deaths
Writers from Gothenburg
Swedish people of Finnish descent